Lee Kin-yan (born 12 May 1961) is a Hong Kong actor, who frequently makes comic cameo appearances in Stephen Chow's films, as a cross-dressing man with a finger up his nose known as Yu Fa  (Chinese: 如花; Cantonese: yu fa; Mandarin: ru2 hua1), meaning "flower-like" in Chinese, and he also acquired his nickname from this character.

Filmography
 The Legend of Zu 2 (2019)
 Hunter Bounty 2 (2019)
 Hunter Bounty 1 (2019)
 A Stupid Journey (2014)
 Long's Story (2014)
 Just Another Margin (2014)
 Ameera (2014)
 Kungfu Cyborg (2009) as Yu Fa
 The Lady Iron Chef (2007)
 Bet to Basic (2006)
 A Chinese Tall Story (2005)
 Kung Fu Mahjong 2 (2005)
 China's Next Top Princess (2005)
 Sex and the Beauties (2004) as Restaurant owner
 Shaolin Soccer (2001) as Manny
 Street Kids Violence (1999) as Uncle San
 Troublesome Night 5 (1999) as Ghost Policeman
 9413 (1998) as Fatty Chuen
 The Lucky Guy (1998)
 Troublesome Night 3 (1998) as Edgy Funeral Director
 03:00 A.M. (1997) as Shing
 Lawyer Lawyer (1997)
 We're No Bad Guys (1997) as Tinny's manager
 Cause We Are So Young (1997) (uncredited)
 Killing Me Tenderly (film) (1997)
 God of Cookery (1996) as Fan Club Member
 Forbidden City Cop (1996) as Emperor's Mistress
 Out of the Dark (1995)
 Once Upon a Time in Triad Society 2 (1996)
 Sixty Million Dollar Man (1995) as Siu-Fu
 From Beijing with Love (1994) as Whore
 Hail the Judge(1994) as Servant
 A Chinese Odyssey Part Two - Cinderella (1994)
 A Chinese Odyssey Part One: Pandora's Box (1994)
 Flirting Scholar (1993)

Sources:

References

External links 
 HKFilms.com Biography & Filmography list
 

Living people
Hong Kong male film actors
Hong Kong male comedians
1961 births